Bruna Costa Alexandre (born 29 March 1995) is a Brazilian para table tennis player who is two-time World bronze medalist and Paralympic bronze medalist in both singles and teams events along with Danielle Rauen.

Life 
Alexandre had her right arm amputated due to thrombosis from a vaccine aged three months old. 

In June 2021 she was one of the women identified as part of Brazil's Paralympic Table Tennis team for the Tokyo Olympics 2020 which were delayed for a year due to the Coronavirus pandemic. The other athletes identified were Cátia Oliveira (class 2), Dani Rauen (in class 9) and Joyce Oliveira (in class 4).

References

1995 births
Living people
Paralympic table tennis players of Brazil
Table tennis players at the 2012 Summer Paralympics
Table tennis players at the 2016 Summer Paralympics
Medalists at the 2016 Summer Paralympics
Brazilian female table tennis players
Paralympic medalists in table tennis
Paralympic bronze medalists for Brazil
Table tennis players at the 2020 Summer Paralympics
21st-century Brazilian women